List of presidents of the American Medical Association (founded 1847):

 Nathaniel Chapman, 1847–48
 Alexander Hodgdon Stevens, 1848–49
 John Collins Warren, 1849–50
 Reuben D. Mussey, 1850–51
 James Moultrie, 1851–52
 Beverly R. Wellford, 1852–53
 Jonathan Knight, 1853–54
 Charles A. Pope, 1854–55
 George Bacon Wood, 1855–56
 Zina Pitcher, 1856–57
 Paul F. Eve, 1857–58
 Harvey Lindsly, 1858–59
 Henry Miller, 1859–60
 Eli Ives, 1860–61
 Alden March, 1863–64
 Nathan Smith Davis, 1864–66
 David Humphreys Storer, 1866–67
 Henry F. Askew, 1867–68
 Samuel D. Gross, 1868–69
 William O. Baldwin, 1869–70
 George Mendenhall, 1870–71
 Alfred Stillé, 1871–72
 D. W. Yandell, 1872–73
 Thomas M. Logan, 1873–74
 Joseph M. Toner, 1874–75
 W. K. Bowling, 1875–76
 J. Marion Sims, 1876–77
 Henry I. Bowditch, 1877–78
 T. G. Richardson, 1878–79
 Theophilus Parvin, 1879–80
 Lewis Sayre, 1880–81
 John T. Hodgen, 1881–82
 J. J. Woodward, 1882–83
 John Light Atlee, 1883–84
 Austin Flint I, 1884–85
 H. F. Campbell, 1885–86
 William Brodie, 1886–87
 E. H. Gregory, 1887–88
 Y. P. Garnett, 1888–89
 W. W. Dawson, 1889–80
 E. M. Moore, 1890–91
 W. T. Briggs, 1891–92
 H. O. Marcy, 1892–93
 Hunter McGuire, 1893–94
 James F. Hibberd, 1894–95
 Donald MacLean, 1885–96
 R. Beverly Cole, 1896–97
 Nicholas Senn, 1897–98
 George Miller Sternberg, 1898–99
 J. M. Mathews, 1899–1900
 W. W. Keen, 1900–01
 C. A. L. Reed, 1901–02
 John Allan Wyeth, 1902–03
 Frank Billings, 1903–04
 John Herr Musser, 1904–05
 L. S. McMurtry, 1905–06
 William James Mayo, 1906–07
 Joseph D. Bryant, 1907–08
 H. L. Burrell, 1908–09
 William C. Gorgas, 1909–10
 William H. Welch, 1910–11
 John Benjamin Murphy, 1911–12
 Abraham Jacobi, 1912–13
 John A. Witherspoon, 1913–14
 Victor C. Vaughan, 1914–15
 William L. Rodman, 1915
 Albert Vander Veer (vice president), 1915–16
 Rupert Blue, 1916–17
 Charles Horace Mayo, 1917–18
 Arthur D. Bevan, 1918–19
 Alexander Lambert, 1919–20
 William Clarence Braisted, 1920–21
 Hubert Work, 1921–22
 George de Schweinitz, 1922–23
 Ray Lyman Wilbur, 1923–24
 William Allen Pusey, 1924–25
 William D. Haggard, 1925–26
 Wendell C. Phillips, 1926–27
 Jabez N. Jackson, 1927–28
 William W. Thayer, 1928–29
 Malcolm L. Harris, 1929–30
 William Gerry Morgan, 1930–31
 E. Starr Judd, 1931–32
 Edward H. Cary, 1932–33
 Dean D. Lewis, 1933–34
 Walter L. Bierring, 1934–35
 James S. McLester, 1935–36
 James Tate Mason, 1936
 Charles Gordon Heyd, 1936–37
 J. H. J. Upham, 1937–38
 Irvin Abell,  1938–39
 Rock Sleyster, 1939–40
 Nathan B. Van Etten, 1940–41
 Frank H. Lahey, 1941–42
 Fred W. Rankin, 1942–43
 James E. Paullin, 1943–44
 Herman L. Kretschmer, 1944–45
 Roger I. Lee, 1945–46
 H. H. Shoulders, 1946–47
 Edward L. Bortz, 1947–48
 Roscoe L. Sensenich, 1948–49
 Ernest E. Irons, 1949–50
 Elmer L. Henderson, 1950–51
 John W. Cline, 1951–52
 Louis H. Bauer, 1952–53
 Edward J. McCormick, 1953–54
 Walter B. Martin, 1954–55
 Elmer Hess, 1955–56
 Dwight H. Murray, 1956–57
 David B. Allman, 1957–58
 Gunnar Gundersen, 1958–59
 Louis M. Orr, 1959–60 
 E. Vincent Askey, 1960–61
 Leonard W. Larson, 1961–62
 George M. Fister, 1962–63
 Edward R. Annis, 1963–64
 Norman A. Welch, 1964
 Donovan F. Ward (vice president), 1964–65
 James Z. Appel, 1965–66
 Charles L. Hudson, 1966–67
 Milford O. Rouse, 1967–68
 Dwight Locke Wilbur, 1968–69
 Gerald D. Dorman, 1969–70
 W. C Bornemeier, 1970–71
 Wesley W. Hall, 1971–72
 C. A. Hoffman, 1972–72
 Russell B. Roth, 1973–74
 Malcolm C. Todd, 1974–75
 Max H. Parrott, 1975–76
 Richard E. Palmer, 1976–77
 John H. Budd, 1977–78
 Thomas E. Nesbitt, 1978–79
 Hoyt D. Gardner, 1979–80
 Robert B. Hunter, 1980–81
 Daniel T. Cloud, 1981–82
 William Y. Rial, 1982–83
 Frank J. Jirka Jr., 1983–84
 Joseph F. Boyle, 1984–85
 Harrison L. Rogers, Jr., 1985–86
 John J. Coury, Jr., 1986–87
 William S. Hotchkiss, 1987–88
 James E. Davis, 1988–89
 Alan R. Nelson, 1989–90
 C. John Tupper, 1990–91
 John J. Ring, 1991–92
 John L. Clowe, 1992–93
 Joseph T. Painter, 1993–94
 Robert E. McAfee, 1994–95
 Lonnie R. Bristow, 1995–96
 Daniel H. Johnson, Jr., 1996–97
 Percy Wootton, 1997–98
 Nancy Dickey, 1998–99
 Thomas Reardon, 1999–2000
 Randolph D. Smoak, Jr., 2000–01
 Richard F. Corlin, 2001–02
 Yank D. Coble, Jr., 2002–03
 Donald J. Palmisano, 2003–04
 John C. Nelson, 2004–05
 J. Edward Hill, 2005–06
 William G. Plested, III, 2006–07
 Ronald M. Davis, 2007–08
 Nancy H. Nielsen, 2008–09
 J. James Rohack, 2009–10
 Cecil B. Wilson, 2010–11
 Peter W. Carmel, 2011–12
 Jeremy A. Lazarus, 2012–13
 Ardis Dee Hoven, 2013–14
 Robert M. Wah, 2014–15
 Steven J. Stack, 2015–16
 Andrew W. Gurman, 2016–17
 David O. Barbe, 2017–18
 Barbara L. McAneny, 2018–2019
 Patrice Harris, 2019–2020
 Susan R. Bailey, 2020-2021
 Gerald E. Harmon, 2021-2022
 Jack Resneck, Jr., 2022-2023

References

American Medical Association
Presidents of the American Medical Association
Presidents of the American Medical Association